HMS Ajax was an  74-gun third-rate ship of the line of the British Royal Navy. She was built by John Randall & Co of Rotherhithe and launched on the Thames on 3 March 1798. Ajax participated in the Egyptian operation of 1801, the Battle of Cape Finisterre in 1805 and the Battle of Trafalgar, before she was lost to a disastrous fire in 1807 during the Dardanelles Operation.

Egypt
Captain James Whitshed had been in charge of the vessel during her later construction stages from January 1798, but she was eventually commissioned in June 1798 under Captain John Holloway. A month later command passed to Captain John Pakenham, for Channel service. After a brief spell under Captain John Osborn in April 1799, Ajax was placed in May 1799 under the command of Captain Alexander Cochrane, who was to command her for two years.

On 9 January 1800 she captured the French privateer Avantageux in the Channel.

In 1801, Cochrane and Ajax participated in the Egyptian operations. On 31 January Ajax anchored at Marmorice on the coast of Karamania.

On 1 March, some 70 warships, together with transports carrying 16,000 troops, anchored in Aboukir Bay near Alexandria. Bad weather delayed disembarkation by a week, but on the 8th, Cochrane directed a landing by 320 boats, in double line abreast, which brought the troops ashore. French shore batteries opposed the landing, but the British were able to drive them back and by the next day Sir Ralph Abercromby's whole force was ashore. Ajax had two of her seamen killed in the landings.

The naval vessels provided a force of 1,000 seamen to fight alongside the army, with Sir Sidney Smith of the 74-gun  in command. On 13 March, Ajax lost one man killed and two wounded in an action on shore; on 21 March she lost two killed and two wounded.

Because Ajax had served in the Egyptian campaign between 8 March 1801 and 2 September, her officers and crew qualified for the clasp "Egypt" to the Naval General Service Medal that the Admiralty authorised in 1850 to all surviving claimants.

Ajax returned to Plymouth from Egypt on 8 June 1802 after the signing of the Treaty of Amiens.

1805

On 31 May 1805 Captain William Brown took command of Ajax. On 22 July, Calder's fleet of 15 sail of the line, two frigates, a cutter and a lugger was off Cape Finisterre when it encountered Admiral Pierre-Charles Villeneuve's combined Spanish-French fleet of 20 ships of the line, three large ships armed en flute, five frigates and two brigs.

Calder sailed towards the French with his force. The battle lasted for more than four hours as the fleets became confused in the failing light and thick patchy fog, which prevented either side from gaining a decisive victory. Still, the British were able to capture two Spanish ships, the 80-gun San Rafael and the 74-gun Firme. The action cost Ajax two men killed and 16 wounded.

Captains Brown and Lechmere were later called as witnesses at the court martial of Sir Robert Calder for his failure to resume the battle the next day in the action in July. As a result, First Lieutenant John Pilfold commanded Ajax at the Battle of Trafalgar. Ajax was seventh in line in Nelson's column and she fired on both the French 74-gun  and the Spanish 136-gun Santissima Trinidad. During the battle Ajax assisted  in forcing the surrender of the French 74-gun . Ajax lost two men killed and nine wounded during the battle.

A storm followed the battle and Ajax rescued seamen from ships in danger of sinking. Lieutenant Pilfold received the Trafalgar medal and a direct promotion to Post-captain in December. Although he missed the battle, Brown was still the official captain and so too received the Trafalgar medal. In 1847, the Admiralty awarded the Naval General Service Medal with clasp "Trafalgar" to all surviving claimants from the battle.

After Trafalgar, Ajax was at the blockade of Cadiz. On 25 November,  detained the Ragusan ship Nemesis, which was sailing from Isle de France to Leghorn, Italy, with a cargo of spice, indigo dye, and other goods. Ajax shared the prize money with ten other British warships.

Loss of Ajax

From January 1806 Ajax was under the command of Captain Henry Blackwood. On 1 February 1807 Ajax joined Admiral Sir John Duckworth's squadron at Malta to participate in the Dardanelles Operation.

During the operation an accidental fire destroyed Ajax. The fire began on the evening of 14 February 1807 while Ajax was anchored off Tenedos. The fire began in the bread-room where the purser and his assistant had negligently left a light burning. As the fire burned out of control, the officers and crew were forced to take to the water. Although 380 people were rescued, 250 lost their lives that night, including many of the crewmen who had been at Trafalgar. Ajax burned through the night and then drifted on to the island of Tenedos where she blew up the following morning. Several theories for the cause of the fire were advanced including spontaneous combustion of the ship's coal and a spark falling into hay stored in the cockpit. A court martial cleared Captain Blackwood.

Horsham Museum
The Shelley Gallery  at Horsham Museum, Horsham, United Kingdom, displays a model of Ajax.

Notes

Citations

References

 Allardyce, Alexander (1882) Memoir of the Honourable George Keith Elphinstone, K.B., Viscount Keith, Admiral of the Red. (Edinburgh and London: W. Blackwood)

External links

 Phillips, Michael - Ships of the Old Navy - HMS Ajax (1798).

1798 ships
Ajax-class ships of the line
Ships built in Rotherhithe
Maritime incidents in 1807
Ship fires
Shipwrecks in the Aegean Sea
Shipwrecks of Turkey